Lyndall Dale McDaniel (December 13, 1935 – November 14, 2020), known as Lindy McDaniel, was an American professional baseball pitcher who had a 21-year career in Major League Baseball from 1955 to 1975.  During his career, he witnessed approximately 3,500 major league games (not including spring training), had more than 300 teammates, and played under eight different managers. He attended the University of Oklahoma and Abilene Christian College, then played with the St. Louis Cardinals, Chicago Cubs, and San Francisco Giants (all of the National League), and the New York Yankees and Kansas City Royals (both of the American League). He stood 6’3” and was listed at 195 lb. (88kg). McDaniel was a minister for the Church of Christ.

Baseball career
McDaniel was named to the National League All-Star team in 1960. He led the league in saves in 1959 (16), 1960 (27), and 1963 (22). He was named The Sporting News Reliever of the Year for the National League in 1960 (the award's inaugural year) as a member of the St. Louis Cardinals, and in 1963 as a member of the Chicago Cubs.

With the New York Yankees in 1970, he amassed a career-high 29 saves, tying the franchise record set by Luis Arroyo in 1961.

His brother, Von, was also a major league pitcher. His other brother, Kerry, played in the minor leagues.

Career highlights
Over a four-game span, McDaniel retired 32 straight hitters in August 1968. In one of those games, he pitched seven perfect innings against the Detroit Tigers. In 1973, he entered the game in the first inning against the Tigers in Detroit and pitched 13 innings, giving up one run and winning the game 2–1. McDaniel pitched in 225 consecutive games in the National League without committing an error, a record.

McDaniel considered his top overall year as 1960 with the St. Louis Cardinals, when he logged a 12–2 mark in relief with 22 saves and an ERA of 1.29 while being named (for the only time in his career) to the National League All-Star team. He earned Fireman of the Year honors, while finishing third for the Cy Young Award and fifth in MVP voting, both his highest placings. He ranked his next-best year as 1970 with the Yankees, when he was 9–5 with a career high 29 saves and 2.01 ERA, followed by the 1963 season when he was 13–7 with 21 saves and a 2.86 ERA.

McDaniel won Fireman of the Year honors in 1960 and 1963. He also led the National League in relief pitching in 1959, but that was the year before the first Fireman of the Year award was presented. With nine saves and a 0.74 ERA, McDaniel was named the Player of the Month for June 1960.

McDaniel held the MLB record for most batters faced in the eighth inning over his career. He allowed four walk-off grand slams during his career, more than any other major league pitcher on record.

As the only New York Yankee pitcher to homer in the 1972 season, McDaniel became the last Yankee hurler to hit a home run before the advent of the designated hitter in 1973.  That home run (which occurred on September 28, 1972 in Detroit) was also the last one hit by a pitcher at Tiger Stadium.

As of 2022, McDaniel holds the distinction have having pitched in the most regular season games (987) without a postseason appearance of any pitcher in MLB history, 187 games clear of next-highest Francisco Cordero.

Death
McDaniel died from COVID-19 on November 14, 2020, during the COVID-19 pandemic in Texas. He was 84.

See also

 List of St. Louis Cardinals team records
 The Sporting News Reliever of the Year Award
 List of Major League Baseball annual saves leaders

References

External links

 Official Website

1935 births
2020 deaths
Deaths from the COVID-19 pandemic in Texas
People from Hollis, Oklahoma
Major League Baseball pitchers
Baseball players from Oklahoma
National League All-Stars
St. Louis Cardinals players
Chicago Cubs players
San Francisco Giants players
New York Yankees players
Kansas City Royals players
Oklahoma Sooners baseball players
Omaha Cardinals players